Nnimmo Bassey (born 11 June 1958) is a Nigerian architect, environmental activist, author and poet, who chaired Friends of the Earth International from 2008 through 2012 and was executive director of Environmental Rights Action for two decades. He was one of Time magazine's Heroes of the Environment in 2009. In 2010, Nnimmo Bassey was named a Laureate of the Right Livelihood Award, and in 2012, he was awarded the Rafto Prize. He also received an honorary doctorate from the University of York, UK, in 2019. He serves on the advisory board and is Director of the Health of Mother Earth Foundation, an environmental think tank and advocacy organization.

Early life and education
Nnimmo Bassey was born on 11 June, 1958. He studied architecture, practiced in the public sector for 10 years and thereafter continued in private practice. He was active on human rights issues in the 1980s when he served on the Board of Directors of Nigeria's Civil Liberties Organization. In 1993, he co-founded a Nigerian (Non-governmental organization) NGO known as Environmental Rights Action (Friends of the Earth Nigeria) in order to advocate, educate and organize around environmental human rights issues in Nigeria. Since 1996, Bassey and Environmental Rights Action led Oil watch Africa and, beginning in 2006, also led the Global South Network, Oil watch International, striving to mobilize communities against the expansion of fossil fuels extraction. Bassey has served in the committees of both Oil watch International and the regional arm, Oil watch Africa since inception. Oil watch Africa has membership in Nigeria, Chad, Cameroon, Congo Democratic Republic, Ghana, Uganda, South Africa, Togo, Kenya, Swaziland, Mozambique, Mali, Sudan, South Sudan and others. Membership of Oil watch International spreads across South America, Southeast Asia, Africa, Europe and North America. The Network works to resist destructive oil, gas and coal extraction activities. It demands an urgent shift from the dominant petroleum-fueled civilization. In 2011, Bassey founded the Ecological think tank, the Health of Mother Earth Foundation promoting environmental climate justice and food sovereignty in Nigeria and Africa. At the 2009 United Nations Climate Change Conference in Copenhagen, Bassey - despite being accredited - was "physically kept out" of a meeting.

Career 
He led Friends of the Earth International from 2008 to 2012 and for two decades, was the executive director of Environmental Rights Action. He is the director of Health of Mother Earth Foundation and have served on the 

 To Cook a Continent: Destructive Extraction and the Climate Crisis in Africa

Other books by Bassey include:
 Patriots & Cockroaches (Poems) 1992
 Beyond Simple Lines: the Architecture of Chief G.Y. Aduku and Archcon (with Okechukwu Nwaeze) 1993
 The Management of Construction [1994]
 Poems on The Run (Poems) 1994
 Oil watching in South America (Environment) [1997]
 Intercepted (Poems) 1998
 We Thought It Was Oil But It Was Blood (Poems), 2002
 Genetically Modified Organisms: the African Challenge (2004)
 Living Houses (Architecture), 2005
 Knee Deep in Crude, ERA Field Reports, ed (2009)
 The Nigerian Environment and the Rule of Law, ed (2009)
 I will Not Dance to Your Beat (poems), Kraft Books, Ibadan. 2011
 We Thought It Was Oil But It Was Blood- Resistance to Military-Corporate Wedlock in Nigeria and Beyond. (TNI/Pluto Press, 2015)
 Oil Politics- Echoes of Ecological Wars- (Daraja Press, 2016).
 SHELL'S FPSO poses serious danger

Awards And Recognitions 
2009 Times Magazine's Hero Of Environment 

2010 Laureate Right Livelihood Award winner 

2012 Rafto Prize winner 

Honorary Doctorate, University of York, UK

See also
 Environmental issues in the Niger Delta
 List of Nigerian architects

References

External links

 Copenhagen: Where Africa Took On Obama By Naomi Klein - December 8th, 2009
 Article from Democracy Now
 Interview in Global Greegrants Fund
 Environment Rights Action, Friends of the earth in Nigeria
 Video of Nnimmo Bassey during the COP15 by The UpTake (Naomi Klein)
 Video: Nigerian Environmentalist Nnimmo Bassey on Bolivia Climate Conference
 Nnimmo Bassey Wins Right Livelihood Award - video report by Democracy Now!

1958 births
Living people
Nigerian environmentalists
Nigerian activists
Friends of the Earth
20th-century Nigerian architects
21st-century Nigerian architects